Aaron Olson (born January 11, 1978) is an American professional road bicycle racer. Olson was raised in Eugene, Oregon. Olson owns and operates Handlebar Coffee Roasters with two locations based in Santa Barbara, CA.

Palmares 

2000
 3rd National U23 Road Race Championships
2003
 1st Overall Valley of the Sun Stage Race
2004
 1st Stage 6 Tour de Beauce
 1st Stage 5 Tour de Toona

External links
 

1978 births
Living people
American male cyclists
Sportspeople from Eugene, Oregon